Mounds is a city in Pulaski County, Illinois, United States. The population was 810 in the 2010 census, a decline from 1,117 in 2000.

Geography
Mounds is located at  (37.114838, -89.199030).

History
The town was named for the prehistoric monumental earthwork mounds in the area.

Demographics

As of the 2000 census, there were 1,117 people, 407 households, and 264 families residing in the city. The racial makeup of the city was 36.53% White, 60.61% African American, 0.18% Native American, 0.18% Asian, 0.45% from other races, and 2.06% from two or more races. Hispanic or Latino of any race were 1.07% of the population.

There were 407 households, out of which 36.1% had children under the age of 18 living with them, 35.1% were married couples living together, 24.6% had a female householder with no husband present, and 35.1% were non-families. 31.9% of all households were made up of individuals, and 15.5% had someone living alone who was 65 years of age or older. The average household size was 2.62 and the average family size was 3.33.

In the city, the population was spread out, with 33.4% under the age of 18, 7.9% from 18 to 24, 22.2% from 25 to 44, 18.3% from 45 to 64, and 18.3% who were 65 years of age or older. The median age was 33 years. For every 100 females, there were 83.1 males. For every 100 females age 18 and over, there were 75.5 males.

The median income for a household in the city was $17,727, and the median income for a family was $20,125. Males had a median income of $27,500 versus $16,250 for females. The per capita income for the city was $11,035. About 38.1% of families and 42.8% of the population were below the poverty line, including 59.7% of those under age 18 and 19.6% of those age 65 or over.

Education
Meridian CUSD 101 is located between Mounds and Mound City east of I-57. Century School District 100 is located on Shawnee College Road between Shawnee College and I-57 near Ullin. Both schools serve grades K-12 and have competitive basketball, baseball, and softball programs.

Notable people
 Ivory "Deek" Watson, an original member of the singing group The Ink Spots, was born in Mounds.
 Eric Hargan, former United States Secretary of Health and Human Services

References

Cities in Illinois
Cities in Pulaski County, Illinois